Chrysopoloma isabellina, or the Isabel’s slug moth. It is a moth in the genus Chrysopoloma. It’s in the family Chrysopolominae.

Distribution 
Chrysopoloma isabellina occurs in Mozambique, South Africa, Tanzania and Zimbabwe.

References 

Lepidoptera of South Africa
Moths described in 1895
Chrysopolominae